Ismail Magomedovich Korgoloyev (born 15 March 1994) is a Russian football player.

Club career
He made his professional debut in the Russian Professional Football League for FC Anzhi-2 Makhachkala on 12 August 2014 in a game against FC Alania Vladikavkaz. He made his Russian Football National League debut for FC Anzhi Makhachkala on 30 May 2015 in a game against FC Sakhalin Yuzhno-Sakhalinsk.

References

External links
 
 Career summary by sportbox.ru

1994 births
Living people
Russian footballers
Association football midfielders
FC Anzhi Makhachkala players